Land of the Lost is the fourth studio album by punk rock band Wipers, released by Restless in 1986. It was reissued on CDR on frontman Greg Sage's Zeno Records, and by German label Gift of Life in 1991.

Critical reception
Maximum Rocknroll praised the title track, writing: "Heavier and riffier than anything the Wipers had previously attempted, 'Land of the Lost' hits like a steamroller on an inexorable march forward." The Spin Alternative Record Guide called the album "the most definitive Wipers record for sound and songwriting, though it lacks the brashness that makes Over the Edge such a joy."

Track listing
All songs written by Greg Sage.
"Just a Dream Away" - 3:16
"Way of Love" - 2:11
"Let Me Know" - 3:03
"Fair Weather Friends" - 3:16
"Land of the Lost" - 4:48
"Nothing Left to Lose" - 4:51
"The Search" - 4:16
"Different Ways" - 4:32
"Just Say" - 3:39

Personnel
 Greg Sage – vocals, guitar, harp; producer; recorded by Greg Sage
 Brad Davidson – bass guitar
 Steve Plouf – drums
 Chris Newman - cover art

References

1986 albums
Wipers albums